Avakaasham is a 1978 Indian Malayalam film, directed by A. B. Raj. The film stars Jayabharathi, Jose Prakash, Sankaradi and Alummoodan in the lead roles. The film has musical score by M. K. Arjunan.

Cast
Jayabharathi 
Jose Prakash 
Sankaradi 
Alummoodan 
M. G. Soman 
Vincent

Soundtrack
The music was composed by M. K. Arjunan and the lyrics were written by P. Bhaskaran & Gopi Kottarappat.

References

External links
 

1978 films
1970s Malayalam-language films
Films directed by A. B. Raj